RAW Artists (RAW:natural born artists) is an international arts organization that operates in the United States, Canada, Australia and Mexico.

History and growth 

RAW was founded in 2009 by its CEO Heidi Luerra and web designer Matthew Klahorst in Los Angeles, California. By 2019, RAW artists was located in 50+ cities in the US. RAW also has locations in Australia,
Canada and Mexico.

Business model

RAW Artists produce platforms in various cities in which independent artists from 10 different creative categories can showcase their work to their community, local business professionals and press. The 10 creative categories of artists include Visual Art, Painting, Photography, Technology, Film, Crafts, Accessories, Beauty (Hair & Makeup), Fashion, Performance Art and Music. The business model is set up to allow artists the opportunity to not pay out of pocket for fees associated with the production of their showcase. To cover these costs, artists can sell 20 tickets to the showcase. The tickets cover costs of production and staff. If all 20 tickets are sold, an artist pays nothing to RAW for the showcase. RAW Artists earn $10 for every ticket they sell after the full 20 ticket commitment is fulfilled. If artists do not sell the 20 tickets, they may pay for the remaining tickets to participate, postpone or opt out of the showcase.   Each RAW artist is paired with the Showcase Director for their city who produces the full event and mentors RAW artists through the process leading up to their showcase.

In 2019 RAW Artists created more tools and resources for independent artists within the RAW community such as the RAW Artists App, RAWards, Industry Exchange, RAW Spotlight and Found Agency.

References

External links 

International artist groups and collectives
Arts organizations established in 2009